Keppel Bay is a bay in Central Queensland, Australia at the mouth of the Fitzroy River on the coast of the Coral Sea.

Extent 
Keppel Bay extends from Station Point on Curtis Island in the Gladstone Region to Zilzie Point at Zilzie in the Shire of Livingstone.

Islands 
The named islands in Keppel Bay from north to south are:

 Round Rock off Zilzie
 Flat Rock off Coorooman
 Girt Island off Keppel Sands / Joskleigh
Shelly Knob off Curtis Island
Satellite Island in the Fitzroy River mouth off Port Alma
Mackenzie Island in the Fitzroy River mouth off Thompson Point
Egg Island in the Fitzroy River mouth off Thompson Point
Mud Island in the Fitzroy River mouth off Thompson Point
Balaclava Island in the Fitzroy River mouth off The Narrows

Despite the name, the islands in Keppel Bay Islands National Park are not within Keppel Bay but are to the north and east of the bay.

History 
Keppel Bay was named by Captain Cook when he was there on 27 May 1770, after Admiral Augustus Keppel of the British Royal Navy.

View

See also

 Great Keppel Island
 Cape Manifold
 Pumpkin Island

References

External links
 University of Queensland:Queensland Places: Keppel Bay Area
 David A. Ryan, Helen C. Bostock, Brendan P. Brooke, Darren Skene: Geomorphology and Stratigraphy of Keppel Bay, South-East Queensland, Australia, Geoscience Australia, 2009

Bays of Queensland
Central Queensland